Trilochan Bhatta is a Nepalese politician and former Chief Minister of Sudurpashchim Province, a province in far-western Nepal. He was unanimously selected Parliamentary Party leader of Communist Party of Nepal for Sudurpashchim pradesh on 12 February 2018. He was appointed as the chief minister, according to Article 168 (1) of the Constitution of Nepal and took the oath of his office and secrecy as a chief minister on 17 February 2018.

Early life
Trilochan Bhatta was born in Phaledi (now K.I. Singh Rural Municipality), Doti, Nepal to Prasad Bhatta and Sharada Devi Bhatta.

See also
 Rajendra Kumar Rai
 Lalbabu Raut
 Rajendra Prasad Pandey
 Krishna Chandra Nepali
 Kul Prasad KC
 Jeevan Bahadur Shahi

References

External links

Living people
Communist Party of Nepal (Maoist Centre) politicians
1969 births
People from Doti District
Chief Ministers of Nepalese provinces
Members of the Provincial Assembly of Sudurpashchim Province